Eastwood is an unincorporated community in Kalamazoo Charter Township, Kalamazoo County in the U.S. state of Michigan. It is a census-designated place (CDP) for statistical purposes and does not have any legal status as an incorporated municipality. The population was 6,340 at the 2010 census.

Geography
Eastwood is in north-central Kalamazoo County, in the eastern part of Kalamazoo Charter Township. It is bordered to the north, west, and south by the city of Kalamazoo and to the east by Comstock Charter Township.

Demographics

As of the census of 2000, there were 6,265 people, 2,572 households, and 1,527 families residing in the CDP. The racial makeup of the CDP was 74.96% White, 19.27% Black or African American, 0.29% Native American, 0.83% Asian, 0.05% Pacific Islander, 1.74% from other races, and 2.87% from two or more races. Hispanic or Latino of any race were 3.61% of the population.

There were 2,572 households, out of which 30.3% had children under the age of 18 living with them, 39.3% were married couples living together, 14.8% had a female householder with no husband present, and 40.6% were non-families. 30.4% of all households were made up of individuals, and 8.4% had someone living alone who was 65 years of age or older.  The average household size was 2.37 and the average family size was 2.95.

In the CDP, the population was spread out, with 25.0% under the age of 18, 11.2% from 18 to 24, 32.5% from 25 to 44, 18.4% from 45 to 64, and 12.9% who were 65 years of age or older.  The median age was 32 years. For every 100 females, there were 87.9 males.  For every 100 females age 18 and over, there were 85.3 males.

The median income for a household in the CDP was $35,763, and the median income for a family was $40,208. Males had a median income of $33,895 versus $24,574 for females. The per capita income for the CDP was $17,313.  About 9.5% of families and 12.1% of the population were below the poverty line, including 15.8% of those under age 18 and 3.8% of those age 65 or over.

Education
Some portions are in Kalamazoo Public Schools while others are in Comstock Public Schools.

References

Unincorporated communities in Kalamazoo County, Michigan
Census-designated places in Michigan
Kalamazoo–Portage metropolitan area
Unincorporated communities in Michigan
Census-designated places in Kalamazoo County, Michigan